Engr. Iqbal Zafar Jhagra (born 17 May 1947) is a Pakistani politician who served as the 28th Governor of Khyber Pakhtunkhwa. Previously, he served as a Senator as well as Secretary-General of the Pakistan Muslim League (N).

Personal life 
Jhagra was born on 17 May 1947 in Peshawar.

References

1947 births
Living people
Pakistan Muslim League (N) politicians
Pakistani Muslims
Nawaz Sharif administration
People from Peshawar
University of Engineering & Technology, Peshawar alumni
Pakistani senators (14th Parliament)
Pakistani civil engineers